Josef Hantych (12 February 1911 – 28 February 1997) was a Czech weightlifter. He competed at the 1936 Summer Olympics and the 1952 Summer Olympics.

References

External links
 

1911 births
1997 deaths
Czech male weightlifters
Olympic weightlifters of Czechoslovakia
Weightlifters at the 1936 Summer Olympics
Weightlifters at the 1952 Summer Olympics
Place of birth missing